Mornas is a commune in the Vaucluse department in the Provence-Alpes-Côte d'Azur region in southeastern France.

Name 
The settlement is attested as Morenatus in 822, Murenatis in 837 and Mornatz ca. 1178.

See also
Communes of the Vaucluse department

References

Communes of Vaucluse